The Holroyd River is a river located on the Cape York Peninsula in Far North Queensland, Australia.

Course and features
The headwaters of the river rise south of Mount White in the McIlwraith Range in the Great Dividing Range. It then flows westwards forming a series of braided channels and continuing through the uninhabited country until merging with the Kendall river near the Kulinchin Outstation and discharging into the Gulf of Carpentaria. The river is joined by eight tributaries including the Kendall River, Sandlewood Creek, Station Creek, Potlappa Creek, The Big Spring, First Spring, Christmas Creek and the Kendle River.

A variety of landscapes are found within the catchment including tropical savannah woodlands, open grasslands, beach ridges, wetlands and paperbark stands.

The river was named in 1864 by the pastoralist Francis Lascelles Jardine after the explorer, doctor and politician Arthur Todd Holroyd.

The traditional owners of the area are the Wik, Bakanh, Thaayorre and Kaanju peoples who inhabited the drainage basin for thousands of years.

Kugu-Muminh is one of the traditional languages which includes the landscape within the local government boundaries of the Cook Shire.

See also

References

Rivers of Far North Queensland
Gulf of Carpentaria